Events from the year 1914 in France.

Incumbents
President: Raymond Poincaré 
President of the Council of Ministers: 
 until 9 June: Gaston Doumergue 
 9 June-13 June: Alexandre Ribot
 starting 13 June: René Viviani

Events
16 March – Wife of French minister Joseph Caillaux shoots Gaston Calmette, the editor of Le Figaro because he threatened to publish Caillaux's love letters to her during his previous marriage; she is later acquitted by a jury.
26 April – French legislative election held.
10 May – French legislative election held.
31 July – Jean Jaurès assassinated by a French nationalist fanatic
3 August – Germany declares war on Russia's ally France.
9 August – Battle of Mulhouse begins, the opening attack of World War I by the French army against Germany.
26 August – Allies withdraw from Le Cateau to Saint-Quentin, after Battle of Le Cateau.
29 August – French Fifth Army attack St. Quentin.
30 August – French Fifth Army retreat from St. Quentin.
2 September – The village of Moronvilliers is occupied by the Germans.
5 September
 London Agreement: No member of the Triple Entente (France, the United Kingdom or Russia) may seek a separate peace with the Central Powers.
 The First Battle of the Marne begins: 50 km north-east of Paris, the French 6th Army under General Maunoury attacks German forces closing on the city. Over 2,000,000 fight (500,000 are killed/wounded) in the Allied victory. A French and British counterattack at the Marne ends the German advance on Paris.
6–8 September – French Army troops are rushed from Paris to join the First Battle of the Marne using Renault Type AG taxicabs.
13 September – The conclusion of the Battle of Grand Couronné ends the Battle of the Frontiers, with the north-east segment of the Western Front stabilising.
25 September – Battle of Albert begins as part of the Race to the Sea.
27 September – First Battle of Artois begins.
28 September – The First Battle of the Aisne ends indecisively.
30 September – British Indian Army Expeditionary Force A arrives at Marseille for service on the Western Front.
1 October – Battle of Arras begins.
4 October – Lens is lost, as French Tenth Army fails to hold back the Germans.
4 November – Britain and France declare war on the Ottoman Empire.
20 December – First Battle of Champagne begins.

Arts and literature

Sport
28 June – The 12th Tour de France begins.

Births

January to March
4 January – Jean-Pierre Vernant, historian and anthropologist (died 2007)
9 January – Lucien Bodard, reporter and writer on events in Asia (died 1998)
10 January – Pierre Cogan, French cyclist (died 2013)
3 February – Michel Thomas, linguist, language teacher and decorated war veteran (died 2005)
17 February – René Vietto, cyclist (died 1988)
19 February – Jacques Dufilho, actor (died 2005)
28 February – Élie Bayol, motor racing driver (died 1995)
21 March – Paul Tortelier, cellist and composer (died 1990)

April to June
4 April – Marguerite Duras, writer and film director (died 1996)
17 April – Janine Micheau, lyric soprano opera singer (died 1976)
25 April – Claude Mauriac, author and journalist (died 1996)
26 April – Lilian Rolfe, heroine of World War II (died 1945)
27 April – Albert Soboul, historian (died 1982)
28 April – Michel Mohrt, editor, essayist, novelist and historian
8 May – Romain Gary, novelist, film director, World War II aviator and diplomat (died 1980)
14 May – Maurice Kriegel-Valrimont, militant communist, resistance fighter and politician (died 2006)
18 May – Pierre Balmain, fashion designer (died 1982)
18 May – Marcel Bernard, tennis player (died 1994)
16 June – Louis Gabrillargues, soccer player (died 1994)
26 June – Antoine Argoud, twice attempted to assassinate Charles de Gaulle (died 2004)
30 June – Agnès-Marie Valois, French nun and nurse (died 2018)

July to September
5 July – Alain de Boissieu, Army chief-of-staff (died 2006)
5 July – Jean Tabaud, artist (died 1996)
21 July – Philippe Ariès, medievalist and historian (died 1984)
30 July – André Nocquet, aikido teacher (died 1999)
31 July – Louis de Funès, actor (died 1983)
19 August
Maurice Bourgès-Maunoury, politician and Prime Minister of France (died 1993)
Raymond Marcellin, politician (died 2004)
20 August – Yann Goulet, sculptor, Breton nationalist and war-time collaborationist with Nazi Germany (died 1999)
30 August – Jean Bottéro, historian (died 2007)
13 September – Henri Curiel, political activist, assassinated (died 1978)
23 September – Maurice Limat, science fiction author (died 2002)
24 September – Jean-Michel Guilcher, French ethnologist (died 2017)

October to December
22 October – André Neher, Jewish scholar and philosopher (died 1988)
13 November – Henri Langlois, pioneer of film preservation and restoration (died 1977)
21 November – Henri Laborit, physician, writer and philosopher (died 1995)
4 December – Claude Renoir, cinematographer (died 1993)
5 December – Odette Joyeux, actress and writer (died 2000)
18 December – Aimé Teisseire, military officer (died 2008)

Deaths
18 January – Georges Picquart, army officer and Minister of War, exposed the truth in the Dreyfus Affair (born 1854)
30 January – Paul Déroulède, author and politician (born 1846)
13 February – Alphonse Bertillon, police officer and forensic scientist (born 1853)
25 March – Frédéric Mistral, poet, shared the Nobel Prize in literature in 1904 (born 1830)
31 July – Jean Jaurès, socialist and pacifist (assassinated) (born 1859)
3 August – Louis Couturat, logician, mathematician, philosopher, and linguist (born 1868)
4 August – Hubertine Auclert, feminist and campaigner for women's suffrage (born 1848)
4 August – Jules Lemaître, critic and dramatist (born 1853)
3 September – Albéric Magnard, composer (born 1865)
6 September – Alfred Mayssonnié
16 September – Louis Bach
23 September – Gaston Lane
26 September – Alain-Fournier, author and soldier (born 1886)
2 October – Joé Anduran

Full date unknown
Jean Alfred Fournier, dermatologist

See also
 1914 in France

References

1910s in France